Band Baja Varat is an Indian television game and talk show in Marathi language originally aired on Zee Marathi. The show was hosted by Pushkaraj Chirputkar, Mrunmayee Deshpande and judged by Renuka Shahane. It premiered from 18 March 2022 by replacing He Tar Kahich Nay.

Concept 
In season 1, two couples whose marriage is fixed played various games and won various gifts and surprises as "Aaher".

In season 2, various Celebrities share their marriage experiences and chat with host about their relationship.

Seasons

Guests 
 Devmanus 2 team
 Bharat Ganeshpure
 Kishori Shahane
 Kirit Somaiya
 Nishigandha Wad
 Alka Kubal
 Shweta Shinde
 Ravi Jadhav
 Aadesh Bandekar
 Jaywant Wadkar

References

External links 
 Season 1 at ZEE5
 Season 2 at ZEE5

Zee Marathi original programming
Marathi-language television shows
Indian reality television series
2022 Indian television series debuts
2022 Indian television series endings